Between Tears and Laughter is a 1964 Hong Kong drama film directed by Lo Chen. Set in Republic of China (1912–49) era Peking (Beiping), the story revolves around a college student (Kwan Shan) and three young women: a wealthy daughter of a government bureaucrat, a traditional singer in a band (both portrayed by Li Li-Hua) and a street kung-fu/acrobat performer (Ivy Ling Po).

The film was selected as the Hong Kong entry for the Best Foreign Language Film at the 37th Academy Awards, but was not accepted as a nominee.

Cast

 Diana Chang Chung Wen
 Paul Chang
 Chen Li-li
 Chen Yen-yen
 Chiang Kuang Chao
 Chin Han
 Chin Ping
 Ching Miao as General
 Fan Mei Sheng
 Fang Yin
 Feng Yi
 Kao Pao-shu
 Han Ying-Chieh		
 Peter Chen Ho		
 Julia Hsia
 Margaret Hsing
 King Hu
 Kao Chao		
 Kao Yuen	
 Carrie Ku Mei	
 Ku Feng as Taoist priest
 Kwan Shan
 Lan Wei Lieh	
 Lee Ching	
 Li Kun	
 Li Li-Hua
 Li Ting
 Li Ying
 Li Yunzhong	
 Ivy Ling Po	
 Ouyang Sha-fei	
 Peng Peng
 Tien Feng	
 Pat Ting Hung	
 Margaret Tu Chuan		
 Wang Hao
 Allison Chang Yen
 Angela Yu Chien
 Yu Wen-hua

See also
 List of submissions to the 37th Academy Awards for Best Foreign Language Film
 List of Hong Kong submissions for the Academy Award for Best Foreign Language Film

References

External links
 
 HK Cinemagic entry
 Between Tears and Smiles at allmovie.com
 Between Tears and Laughter aka Between Tears and Smiles (1964) at dianying.com
 Between Tears and Laughter (1964) at senscritique.com
 Between Tears and Laughter at filmaffinity.com
 Film at letterboxd.com

1964 films
1960s Mandarin-language films
1964 drama films
Hong Kong black-and-white films
Films directed by Yueh Feng
Hong Kong drama films